Philip Sidney, 3rd Earl of Leicester (10 January 1619 – 6 March 1698) was an English politician who sat in the House of Commons at various times between 1640 and 1659 and became Earl of Leicester in 1677. He supported the Parliamentarian cause in the Wars of the Three Kingdoms, when he was known as Viscount Lisle, a subsidiary title of the Earls of Leicester.

Sidney was the son of Robert Sidney, 2nd Earl of Leicester, and his wife Dorothy Percy, daughter of Henry Percy, 9th Earl of Northumberland. In April 1640, he was elected Member of Parliament for Yarmouth, Isle of Wight in the Short Parliament. He was elected MP for both Yarmouth and St Ives for the Long Parliament in November 1640, and chose to sit for Yarmouth. He was Colonel of a Regiment of Horse in Ireland in 1641.

Lord Lisle supported the parliamentarian cause in the civil war and was Lord Lieutenant and Commander-in-Chief of Ireland from 1646 to 1647. He survived Pride's Purge in 1648 to sit in the Rump Parliament and was a councillor of state from 1648 to 1650. He was appointed a judge for the trial of King Charles I but declined to act. He was president of the council from 1651 to 1652. He was councillor of state and councillor to the lord protector in 1653. Also in 1653, he was elected MP for Kent in the Barebones Parliament. In 1654 he was elected MP for Isle of Wight, a constituency that only existed in the First Protectorate Parliament. He was appointed to Cromwell's "House of Lords" in 1658 under the designation "Lord Viscount Lisle". In 1659 he was returned to the House of Commons for the Restored Rump parliament.

On the restoration of King Charles II in 1660 Lord Lisle received a pardon. In 1677 he inherited the Earldom on the death of his father.

Lord Lisle married Lady Catherine Cecil, daughter of William Cecil, 2nd Earl of Salisbury, and his wife Lady Catherine Howard, in 1645. Their children were Dorothy and Robert; the latter succeeded to his father's earldom.

His younger brother Algernon Sydney fought for Parliament in the First English Civil War, denounced Oliver Cromwell as a tyrant, and was executed for treason in 1683 for alleged involvement in the Rye House Plot. Henry Sydney (1641-1704) was a signatory of the 1688 Invitation to William, inviting him to remove James II of England from the throne.

References

Sources
 
 
 

 
 
 

|-

1619 births
1698 deaths
3rd Earl of Leicester
Lords Lieutenant of Ireland
Roundheads
Philip
English MPs 1640 (April)
English MPs 1640–1648
English MPs 1648–1653
English MPs 1653 (Barebones)
English MPs 1654–1655
Members of Parliament for the Isle of Wight